Kistaram is a town in Khammam district, Telangana, India.

Geography

Location
Kistaram is 80 km from Khammam. Nearest airport is Hyderabad Airport.

References

External links
 About Kistaram
 Satellite image of Kistaram

Cities and towns in Khammam district